Giuliano Loporchio (born 11 December 1991) is an Italian judoka.

He is the bronze medallist of the 2017 Judo Grand Prix Zagreb in the -100 kg category.

References

External links
 

1991 births
Living people
Italian male judoka
20th-century Italian people
21st-century Italian people